Brooklyn Township is a township in Susquehanna County, Pennsylvania, United States. The population was 793 at the 2020 census.

Geography

History
Brooklyn Township was formed from the southern part of Bridgewater Township in April 1814.  Originally called Waterford Township, it was renamed Hop Bottom Township in 1823 and finally Brooklyn Township in 1825.

Demographics

As of the census of 2010, there were 963 people, 383 households, and 262 families residing in the township.  The population density was 39.6 people per square mile (15.3/km2).  There were 443 housing units at an average density of 18.2/sq mi (7.1/km2).  The racial makeup of the township was 97.8% White, 0.4% African American, 0.5% Asian, 0.2% from other races, and 1% from two or more races. Hispanic or Latino of any race were 1.8% of the population.

There were 383 households, out of which 28.2% had children under the age of 18 living with them, 56.1% were married couples living together, 5.7% had a female householder with no husband present, and 31.6% were non-families. 26.1% of all households were made up of individuals, and 12.5% had someone living alone who was 65 years of age or older.  The average household size was 2.51 and the average family size was 3.08.

In the township the population was spread out, with 22.1% under the age of 18, 59.8% from 18 to 64, and 18.1% who were 65 years of age or older.  The median age was 45 years.

The median income for a household in the township was $39,792, and the median income for a family was $44,632. Males had a median income of $40,417 versus $28,125 for females. The per capita income for the township was $23,275.  About 13.9% of families and 18.3% of the population were below the poverty line, including 28.2% of those under age 18 and 14.6% of those age 65 or over.

References

Populated places established in 1787
Townships in Susquehanna County, Pennsylvania
Townships in Pennsylvania